This is a list of English-language words of Hindi and Urdu origin, two distinguished registers of the Hindustani language. Many of the Hindi and Urdu equivalents have originated from Sanskrit; see List of English words of Sanskrit origin. Many others are of Persian origin; see List of English words of Persian origin. Some of the latter are in turn of Arabic or Turkic origin. In some cases words have entered the English language by multiple routes - occasionally ending up with different meanings, spellings, or pronunciations, just as with words with European etymologies. Many entered English during the British Raj. These borrowings, dating back to the colonial period, are often labeled as "Anglo-Indian".

A
 Avatar From Hindi inherited from Sanskrit अवतार (avatāra), "to cross down" referring to the descent of a deity from a heaven.

 Aloo from Hindi, Urdu, and Sanskrit ālū .

B
 Bangle  from  बांगड़ी, a type of bracelet.
 Blighty  "Britain" (as a term of endearment among British troops stationed in Colonial India): from Hindi-Urdu vilāyatī (विलायती, ولايتى) "foreign", ultimately from Arabo-Persian ولايتي "provincial, regional".
 Bungalow from बंगला bangla and Urdu بنگلہ bangla, literally, "(house) in the Bengal style".

C
 Charpoy  from / and /.
 Chaat  from Hindustani cāṭ.
 Cheetah  from chītā, چیتا, चीता, meaning "variegated". 
 Chhatri  from Hindustani چھتری / छतरी (chatrī, “umbrella, canopy”).
 Chit  from چٹھی चिट्ठी chitthi, a letter or note.
 Chutney  from 'chaṭnī', چٹنی, चटनी, ultimately derived from full-infinitive word 'chāṭnā', چاٹنا, चाटना, meaning 'to lick'.   
 Cot  from khāṭ, खाट, a bed.
 Chowkat  from chokath, چوکھٹ / चौखट, a door frame.
 Cummerbund   ultimately from Persian via Hindi-Urdu /,  – from kamar 'waist, loins' and -bandi 'band'.
 Cushy from Hindi-Urdu /, from Persian خوش ḵuš. Some sources prefer an origin from "cushion"

D
 Dacoit from Daku, meaning a member of a class of criminals who engage in organized robbery and murder. Hence also dacoity (banditry)
 Dekko  (UK slang for 'a look') from دیکھو देखो Dekho, the imperative 'look', (دیکھو देखो) meaning look at or study something.
 Dinghy from Dinghi, small boat, wherry-boat
 Dungaree Heavy denim fabric, also referring to trousers made thereof, from Hindi डूंगरी (ḍūṅgrī, “coarse calico”), first worn by labourers in the Dongri area of Mumbai (Bombay).

G
 Ganja Hindi term for marijuana. Popularized by Jamaica after Indian indentured labourers introduced the plant to the island during the 19th century.
 Garam masala from Hindi गरम मसाला and Urdu گرم مصالحہ garam masālā, literally "hot ( = spicy) mixture", from Persian  garm 'warm, hot' and Arabic   'benefits, requirements, ingredients'.
 Gavial from Hindustani ghaṛiyāl,گھڑیال / घड़ियाल, ultimately derived from the Sanskrit word घण्टिक.
 Guru from Hindi guru "teacher, priest," from Sanskrit गुरु  "one to be honored, teacher," literally "heavy, weighty."
 Gymkhana  A term which originally referred to a place where sporting events take place and referred to any of various meets at which contests were held to test the skill of the competitors. In English-speaking countries, a gymkhana refers to a multi-game equestrian event performed to display the training and talents of horses and their rider [-khānā from Pers. khānāh خانه "house, dwelling"]

J
 Jaconet modification of Sanskrit jagannaath, from Jagannath Puri, India, where such cloth was first made.
 JodhpursFull-length trousers, worn for horseback riding, that are close-fitting below the knee, flared and roomy at the thigh, and have reinforced patches on the inside of the leg. Named after Jodhpur, where similar garments are worn by Indian men as part of everyday dress.
 Juggernaut  from Jagannath, a form of Vishnu particularly worshipped at the Jagannath Temple, Puri, Odisha where during Rath Yatra festival thousands of devotees pull three temple carts some 14m (45 feet) tall, weighing hundreds of tons through the streets. These carts seat three statues of the deities, meant to be two brothers and their sister for a 'stroll' outside after the ritual worship session. They are fed by thousands and thousands of worshipers with holy food, as if the icons were living. Early European visitors witnessed these festivals and returned with—possibly apocryphal—reports of religious fanatics committing suicide by throwing themselves under the wheels of the carts. So the word became a metaphor for something immense and unstoppable because of institutional or physical inertia; or impending catastrophe that is foreseeable yet virtually unavoidable because of such inertia.
 Jungle  from the Sanskrit word जङ्गल jaṅgala, and later jangal in Hindi as जंगल and Urdu as جنگل. Jaṅgala means "uncultivated land" which refers to the wilderness or forest.

K

 Khaki from ख़ाकी khākī "of dust colour, dusty, grey", cf. Hindi  - Urdu خاکی [ultimately from Persian].
 Karma from Sanskrit, the result of a person's actions as well as the actions themselves. It is a term about the cycle of cause and effect.
 Kedgeree from Hindi खिचड़ी, Kedgeree is thought to have originated with the Indian rice-and-bean or rice-and-lentil dish khichri, traced back to 1340 or earlier.

L
 Loot  from Loot لوٹ लूट, meaning 'steal'. Robbery

M
 Multan from Multan, Pakistan: A kind of rug prevalent there.
 Mogul from Hindi and Urdu: An acknowledged leader in a field, from the Mughal rulers of India like Akbar and Shah Jahan, the builder of the Taj Mahal.
 Maharaja from Hindi and Sanskrit: A great king.
 Mantra from Hindi and Sanskrit: a word or phrase used in meditation.
 Masala from Urdu, to refer to Indian flavoured spices

N
 Nirvana (in Jainism, Hinduism, Sikhism, and Buddhism) a transcendent state in which there is neither suffering, desire, nor sense of self, and the subject is released from the effects of karma and the cycle of death and rebirth. It represents the final goal of Jainism, Hinduism, Sikhism, and Buddhism.

P
 Pashmina from Hindi पश्मीना, Urdu پشمينه, ultimately from Persian پشمينه.
 Punch from Hindi and Urdu panch پانچ, meaning "five". The drink was originally made with five ingredients: alcohol, sugar, lemon, water, and tea or spices. The original drink was named paantsch.
 Pundit  from पण्डित Pandit, meaning a learned scholar or Priest.
 Pukka  (UK slang: "genuine") from Pakkā पक्का, پکا cooked, ripe, solid.
 Purdah  from Hindi-Urdu ,  Pardah (ultimately from Persian) meaning 'the pre-election period'.
 Pyjamas from Hindi and Urdu, پاجامہ / पाजामा, meaning "leg garment", coined from Persian پاى "foot, leg" and جامه "garment" .

R
 Raita from Hindi and Urdu रायता رائتہ rayta. yogurt based dish, some add sliced/chopped/diced, cucumbers, onions, tomatoes, pineapples, pomegranate or other salads to complement rice or roti meals.
 Roti from Hindi and Urdu रॊटी روٹی roti "bread"; akin to Prakrit रॊट्ट rotta "rice flour", Sanskrit रोटिका rotika "kind of bread".

S
 Sepoy Sepoy is derived from the Persian word sepāhī (سپاہی) meaning "infantry soldier" and was designated as a rank in the Mughal Army. The title and rank were implemented by the East India Company and later the British Raj. The term continues to be used for noncommissioned ranks in the Indian and Pakistani and Nepalese militaries.

 Shampoo Derived from Hindustani chāmpo (चाँपो [tʃãːpoː]) (verb imperative, meaning "rub!"), dating to 1762.

T
 Teapoy from charpoy ,چارپائی Teen payi (तीन पाय) in Hindi-Urdu, meaning "three legged" or "coffee table".
Thug from Thagi ,ٹھگ Thag in Hindi-Urdu, meaning "thief or con man".
 Tickety-boo possibly from Hindi  (ṭhīk hai, bābū), meaning "it's all right, sir".
 Toddy (also Hot toddy)  from Tārī , juice of the palmyra palm.
 Typhoon from Urdu  toofaan. A cyclonic storm.

V
 Verandafrom Hindustani baramdaa برآمدہ / बरामदा, but ultimately from Portuguese.

Y

 YaarA colloquial South Asian word, it has been defined as a noun to refer to a ‘familiar form of address: friend, mate’. It is originally a loanword from Persian یار (yār). The first known use of yaar in English was in 1963.

See also
 Glossary of the British Raj
 Indian English
 Hobson-Jobson
 List of English words of Sanskrit origin
 Lists of English words of international origin

References

External links
Category: Hindi derivations in Wiktionary
Etymology of Selected Words of Indian Language Origin  in Colonial and Postcolonial Literary Dialogues
English to Hindi Dictionary

Hindi
Hindi
English words
English
English